Bosu Book Street is the book street in Bosu-dong, Jung District, Busan, South Korea. Bosu Book Street has a lot of bookstores.

References

External links

Jung District, Busan
Bookstores of South Korea
Tourist attractions in Busan
Antiquarian booksellers
Bookstore neighborhoods